Crime statistics refer to systematic, quantitative results about crime, as opposed to crime news or anecdotes. Notably, crime statistics can be the result of two rather different processes:
 scientific research, such as criminological studies, victimisation surveys;
 official figures, such as published by the police, prosecution, courts, and prisons.
However, in their research, criminologists often draw on official figures as well.

Methods 
There are several methods for the measuring of crime. Public surveys are occasionally conducted to estimate the amount of crime that has not been reported to police. Such surveys are usually more reliable for assessing trends. However, they also have their limitations and generally don't procure statistics useful for local crime prevention, often ignore offenses against children and do not count offenders brought before the criminal justice system.

Law enforcement agencies in some countries offer compilations of statistics for various types of crime.

Two major methods for collecting crime data are law enforcement reports, which only reflect crimes that are reported, recorded, and not subsequently canceled; and victim study (victimization statistical surveys), which rely on individual memory and honesty. For less frequent crimes such as intentional homicide and armed robbery, reported incidences are generally more reliable, but suffer from under-recording; for example, no criming in the United Kingdom sees over one third of reported violent crimes being not recorded by the police. Because laws and practices vary between jurisdictions, comparing crime statistics between and even within countries can be difficult: typically only violent deaths (homicide or manslaughter) can reliably be compared, due to consistent and high reporting and relative clear definition.

The U.S. has two major data collection programs, the Uniform Crime Reports from the FBI and the National Crime Victimization Survey from the Bureau of Justice Statistics. However, the U.S. has no comprehensive infrastructure to monitor crime trends and report the information to related parties such as law enforcement.

Research using a series of victim surveys in 18 countries of the European Union, funded by the European Commission, has reported (2005) that the level of crime in Europe has fallen back to the levels of 1990, and notes that levels of common crime have shown declining trends in the U.S., Canada, Australia and other industrialized countries as well. The European researchers say a general consensus identifies demographic change as the leading cause for this international trend. Although homicide and robbery rates rose in the U.S. in the 1980s, by the end of the century they had declined by 40%.

However, the European research suggests that "increased use of crime prevention measures may indeed be the common factor behind the near universal decrease in overall levels of crime in the Western world", since decreases have been most pronounced in property crime and less so, if at all, in contact crimes.

Counting rules
Relatively few standards exist and none that permit international comparability beyond a very limited range of offences. However, many jurisdictions accept the following:
 There must be a prima facie case that an offence has been committed before it is recorded. That is either police find evidence of an offence or receive a believable allegation of an offense being committed. Some jurisdictions count offending only when certain processes happen, such as an arrest is made, ticket issued, charges laid in Court or only upon securing a conviction.
 Multiple reports of the same offence usually count as one offence. Some jurisdictions count each report separately, others count each victim of offending separately.
 Where several offences are committed at the same time, in one act of offending, only the most serious offense is counted. Some jurisdictions record and count each and every offense separately, others count cases, or offenders, that can be prosecuted.
 Where multiple offenders are involved in the same act of offending only one act is counted when counting offenses but each offender is counted when apprehended.
 Offending is counted at the time it comes to the attention of a law enforcement officer. Some jurisdictions record and count offending at the time it occurs.
 As "only causing pain" is counted as assault in some countries, it let higher assault rates except in Austria, Finland, Germany, the Netherlands, Portugal and Sweden. But there are exceptions, like Czech Republic and Latvia. France was the contrasting exception having a high assault ratio without counting minor assaults.
Offending that is a breach of the law but for which no punishment exists is often not counted. For example: Suicide, which is technically illegal in most countries, may not be counted as a crime, although attempted suicide and assisting suicide are.

Also traffic offending and other minor offending that might be dealt with by using fines rather than imprisonment, is often not counted as crime. However separate statistics may be kept for this sort of offending.

Surveys
Because of the difficulties in quantifying how much crime actually occurs, researchers generally take two approaches to gathering statistics about crime.

However, as officers can only record crime that comes to their attention and might not record a matter as a crime if the matter is considered minor and is not perceived as a crime by the officer concerned.

For example, when faced with a domestic violence dispute between a couple, a law enforcement officer may decide it is far less trouble to arrest the male party to the dispute, because the female may have children to care for, despite both parties being equally culpable for the dispute. This sort of pragmatic decisionmaking asked if they are victims of crime, without needing to provide any supporting evidence. In these surveys it is the participant's perception, or opinion, that a crime occurred, or even their understanding about what constitutes a crime that is being measured.

As a consequence differing methodologies may make comparisons with other surveys difficult.

One way in which, while other types of crime are under reported. These surveys also give insights as to why crime is reported, or not. The surveys show that the need to make an insurance claim, seek medical assistance, and the seriousness of an offence tend to increase the level of reporting, while the inconvenience of reporting, the involvement of intimate partners and the nature of the offending tend to decrease reporting.

This allows degrees of confidence to be assigned to various crime statistics. For example: Motor vehicle thefts are generally well reported because the victim may need to make the report for an insurance claim, while domestic violence, domestic child abuse and sexual offences are frequently significantly under-reported because of the intimate relationships involved, embarrassment and other factors that make it difficult for the victim to make a report.

Attempts to use victimisation surveys from different countries for international comparison had failed in the past. A standardised survey project called the International Crime Victims Survey Results from this project have been briefly discussed earlier in this article.

Classification
While most jurisdictions could probably agree about what constitutes a murder, what constitutes a homicide may be more problematic, while a crime against the person could vary widely. Legislation differences often means the ingredients of offences vary between jurisdictions.

The International Crime victims Survey has been done in over 70 countries to date and has been a 'de facto' standard for defining common crimes. Complete list of countries participating and the 11 defined crimes can be found at the project web site.

In March 2015 the UNODC published the first version of the International Classification of Crime for Statistical Purposes (ICCS).

Measures
More complex measures involve measuring the numbers of discrete victims and offenders as well as repeat victimisation rates and recidivism. Repeat victimisation involves measuring how often the same victim is subjected to a repeat occurrence of an offence, often by the same offender. Repetition rate measures are often used to assess the effectiveness of interventions.

See also
 Crime in the United States
 Crime science
 Crime statistics in the United Kingdom
 Dark figure of crime
 List of countries by intentional homicide rate
 List of countries by incarceration rate
 List of countries by execution rate
 Moral statistics
 Questionnaire
 Self report study
 Statistical correlations of criminal behaviour
 The International Crime Victims Survey
 United States cities by crime rate
 Victim study
 Victimology

Notes

Further reading

External links
 crime-statistics.co.uk, UK Crime Statistics and Crime Statistic Comparisons
 A Continent of Broken Windows – Alexander, Gerard The Weekly Standard (Volume 11, Issue 10, 21 November 2005)
 United States: Uniform Crime Report -- State Statistics from 1960 - 2005
 Experience and Communication as explanations for Criminal Risk Perception
 Regional crime rates 2011
 Crime statistics for 2013 released, FBI

 
Law enforcement